The Hawaii Rainbow Wahine volleyball team is the NCAA Division I women's volleyball team for the University of Hawaiʻi at Mānoa. They are a member of the Big West Conference and are led by head coach, Robyn Ah Mow-Santos. The Rainbow Wahine volleyball program remains a large source of financial income for the University of Hawaii athletic department, notwithstanding even what FB and MBB generates.

Grandfathered in, and straddling the line between the two governing bodies of the AIAW and NCAA, Joyce Kapuaala-Kaapuni started with Hawaii in 1974 (alongside USAV's 1970 World's participant Beth McLachlin). She'd continue with her UH college career in 1982-83 forging first in the NCAA, winning back-to-back national championships.

As show, volleyball has always been a celebrated linchpin between islands. A token manifested, then, person being, Kawehi Ka'a'a (2x UHH First Team All-American) who'd participate in three Final Fours (AIAW, UHH, 1978 & 1979 and AIAW, UHM, 1980). The follow-up was a Regional Final versus USC in the inaugural NCAAs, 1981. The UHM WVB program moreover frequently pays visits to Hilo and Kahului in competition during the spring. In 1974, for back-to-back matches somewhere between Sept.–Nov., it all began coincidentally on the island of Kaua'i, the eldest of all major-islands in the Hawaiian archipelago.  
   
The team has won four national championships: one AIAW title and three NCAA Division I titles. The Rainbow Wahine played in the Big West Conference from 1988 to 1995. They joined the Western Athletic Conference (WAC) in 1996 and clinched at least a share of the regular-season conference title each year until 2012, when the Rainbow Wahine re-joined the Big West Conference. Hawaii won the WAC Tournament (and the WAC's automatic NCAA Tournament bid) in 1998 and every year between 2001 and 2011 except in 2010, when Hawaii lost in the tournament's final round to the Utah State Aggies. All four national championship squads have been team inducted into the UH Hall of Honor, of the Hawaii Athletics most prestigious, since 1981-82 (the NCAA's WVB birth).

Under the banner of 1987 Hawaiian Airlines, UH would capture the third placed Berkeley, CA, USAV Open Nationals title (of mid-May) this year. A Tita of UHM, being recognized as the consecutive all-tourney, had fallen to NorCal's Carlson Chrysler (1st place) and the American SW's Merrill Lynch (2nd).

In 1988 the USA's Major League Volleyball (MLV being first in the country, an all female league), they'd draft Wahine all-American (Swede) Vorwerk to the Los Angeles Starlites as the number one overall pick. She'd later compete on the international beach circuit in the following years with her native Sweden.

Non-existent (since 2017), ten-time National Champions (w the NCAA Division II most recently), Brigham Young Hawaii had been the only other university statewide to have ever beat the Rainbow Wahine (once, 1992). Current coach Robyn Ah Mow-Santos would begin at UHM the following year in the re-establishment of order; she solidified the starting lineup in leading this team to the NCAA Regional Final, in Long Beach, CA (1993).

On 21 October 1994, the Rainbow Wahine played their first match in the Stan Sheriff Center against the AVCA polled RV San Jose State Spartans. The Rainbow Wahine led the nation in home game attendance from 1995 to 2014, with a cumulative average of more than 6,800 fans per match, until the Nebraska Cornhuskers moved into the Devaney Center and began averaging over 8,000 fans at each home match.
 
The 1996 NCAA Division I women's volleyball tournament began with 48 teams (with a 12 team, six matches play-in meet) which ended on December 21, 1996, when Stanford defeated Hawaiʻi in the NCAA championship match. In the order of 3–0 sweeps, UH went over, routing, Colorado, Texas, BYU, Florida before succumbing 0–3, themselves, to the Cardinal. Retrospective this current 2017–present, Wahine-now leaders are the Head Coach, the Assistant Coach and the Director of Volleyball Operations (DoVO); perhaps not coincidentally they were the principled headwomen as athletes then.

Junior #2-Susie Boogaard (2002-2005), iffy, informally, has the best season of her UH career. Averaging approximately 15 home matches per year, the parents of Boogaard had purchased tickets for unlimited flights, on annual passes by ATA Airlines, out of Los Angeles into Honolulu. The Ahuna's (1984-1987), reflexive, went Honolulu to the Continental U.S.

It would be also that in 2006, former player Kari Anderson (1991–94) moved into the Associate Head Coach's position; she'd been an Assistant ever since '96-1997. She is still the longest tenured right-handed aide in UH WVB history. She'd retired from volleyball in early 2011.

UHM is a perfect 24–0 against UH Hilo in their own state turf series, dating back to the mid-1970s. On September 12, 2009, the program notched its 1,000th victory with a 3–0 win over Stanford; this series favors UH 19–13. On December 11, 2015, the Wahine defeated seven-time national champions Penn State 3–0. Rarefied, NU(s'), of the great state consequentially of Nebraska, archives presenting the 8-8 HI-NE tie makes for Hawaiian celebratory tenor; the Rainbow and Cornhuskers wahine (beginning with 1975), both showstoppers, they codify the winner's tradition(s).

On 1989 December 8, 1989,  a number one ranked Rainbow Wahine, quite objectively, referenced through annals which show those (that) analyzed statistically (e.g. kills, digs and percentages); they'd beat another AVCA Top 25 program in Cal Poly SLO, at Stockton, California, in the regional semifinal 15–9, 15–17, 9–15, 15–12, 15–12. Others via the official NCAA's history might suggest that the longest game of  hours, between the #6 BYU Cougars and #7 UH, this manages ensured the best match chronicled with a UH win 15–12, 21–19, 13–15, 16–18, 24–22. This latter mentioned match occurred in the 1998 Las Vegas WAC Championships final. Of that 1998 post–season blossomed run into the NCAA Elite Eight, having incidentally been 1996 sophomore understudy to Coach Ah Mow at setter, Nikki (sept Ivarie's) Hubbert would appear and win the Family Feud game show versus the Couchois clan (2007). Senior-Hubbert holds the all time UH record(s) for total assists and assists per set in a year: 1998.

To date the Rainbow Wahine are a perfect 4–0 against the U.S. Armed Services (Air Force, Navy, Army and Coast Guard). They are 1-0 versus the Ivy League ('W' on Brown, 12/98). They stand with HURCN Lane at 39?-38 along their long-time rival's side, UCLA of the robust Pac-12. Na Wahine is 1–0 versus U.S. International, now Alliant University; they are tied (at 0s) with Sul Ross State University Texas, being thee original AIAW power (then DGWS - Division of Girls and Women in Sport), who first sponsored women's intercollegiate volleyball beginning in 1970.

Crew 2008: Not since UH's AIAW days had a team been recognized with those assembled recipients, being called to be as it were, stacked with prominent national accolades. These individuals included, 1st Team AVCA all-American Kanani Danielson, 1st Team Volleyball Magazine all-Americans Amber Kaufman and Jamie Houston, 2nd Team AVCA all-American Brittany Hewitt, 3rd Team AVCA all-American Aneli Cubi-Otineru, 2xHM AVCA all-American Dani Mafua, The Elite 88 Award winner Stephanie Brandt, COBRA Mag. All-National Stephanie Ferrell. Additionally, TESL Certificate awardee Catherine Fowler-de Silva would promote English while, simultaneously, playing quasi-professionally: Thailand, Asia; England, UK; then later in El Molar, Madrid, Spain (with C.V. Torrejon). They were exclusive hosts to the WAC End-of-season Tournament; going 20–3 at home, 11–1 away, they finished with a common 30+ wins season.

2011

Senior Leader: Kanani Danielson

Returning (as sophomores): Prepvolleyball.com's #10 '10 Class (Top 100's Hartong, Uiato, Goodman, Waber)

Highlights: Early, September 1-4th, the Hawaiian Airlines Wahine Volleyball Classic again drew for one of the best preseason collegiate tournaments in the nation; advancements, daily, featured four AVCA Top 25s (UCLA, The Ohio State University, Long Beach State, at Manoa). AVCA #21 Pepperdine then came into Honolulu for back-to-back matches against the, timed, #11 ranked 'Bows two weeks later. Memorably the second September 17 game, preceding CBS's Hawaii Five-0 (2010 TV series, season 2) fifth episode airing 11 October, resulted in a second consecutive win for UH (twice–3-1). It was titled "Maʻemaʻe"/"Clean." The season would be the final one for UH in the WAC. The reigning Top 25, BWC Champions (14-2) Cal State Fullerton Titans, featuring eventual professional in two-time HM AVCA all-American Kayla Neto (2009-2012), they would succumb leadership to the upcoming and into Orange Co.-Wahine. Both teams would jointly wrangle to end their final regular seasons' schedule; the American NCAA collegiate women's volleyball league, annually, offering its Thanksgiving weekend matches. UH's post season Honolulu Regional would subsequently steal #25 Colorado State's victory in the second round thereafter. A tough loss to proceeding AVCA #1 USC (eventual NCAA third place–tied), 12–15 in the fifth, would end UHM's season heavily.

Contemporaneously, nascent-ly, perturbed in performance anxiety (at times), Los Angeles native TK was an aspiring actress at the age of 12. Measuring 1.12 meters, then 3'8", it was within a 10 years' moment which the former sought after 6'1' VB Magazine / Prepvolleyball.com Top-50 athlete left Manoa a graduate (2013–14). UHM-fulfilled, those believing, providing living verve with first-in-family college grads moreover.

2012 Prime Scholastic Season
The particular match of the year was played on Saturday, September 15 at 00:00 CDT. The auspicious headline thereafter read: Rainbow Wahine Volleyball Tops Alumnae In Four Sets.

2015 beginnings

This team was circumstantially given the entire Thanksgiving Day's weekend, at home (near and far), to spend gratefully with family and friends. It hadn't been since 1980 that this luxury was afforded this program. To be Sr. Volleyball Magazine HM All-American McKenna Granato earns valuable playing time in this season's Des Moines, IA Regional; the entire team consequently, having been accordingly empowered, subjectively quipped, post-Turkey Day.

Five years in, The Big West Conference with Ah Mow-starring, for Sheng Xiao's "Ox year" ('21 occurring), UHM, progressively, always competes well. Too, Ah Mow-Santos will also earn an extension of one year to her coaching contract to boot.

School's Year 2016-17

The 2016 season marked the end of an era for the AVCA Top-10 UHM program. Dave Shoji, with medical issues himself, retired at helm of Hawaiian VB trailblazer. Three all-Americans (Taylor, Mitchem, Maglio), six PrepVB Fab-50's (Iosia, Higgins, Kahakai, Granato, Castillo, Greeley) and the tallest 6'5" ever-Wahine (Burns) comprised the team that season. Prior, in 2015, as the Honolulu Star-Advertiser beat chronicled, a one Kalei Adolpho, hailing from nook Ho'olehua, Molokai, was also notably able to join these same; imposing as a Top-10 on UHM's international European multi-stop Summer Tour, atypical were all outside of the Orient comparatively.

Trivially, the incidental would further place Hawai'i at a 7-4 winning advantage against Florida schools (significant University of Florida and Florida State) within annals marked. As of 2016, both UF and UTAUS own their own 22 conference championships—in tie; they've managed to command their respective regions. Comparatively, the UH (with an 11-2 all-time-series advantage against UT Austin) owns outright its own 25 conference championships.

For the second consecutive year Thanksgiving was a bonus. Unfortunately, during the NCAA second round the team's star player went down—with injuries—of the first few points in Minneapolis. The twice AVCA Beach Volleyball all-American, consequently, wouldn't be the same.

2017

O Canada! Twin towers would aptly describe this season's anchored 6'3" and 6'5" middle blockers, long, lean and sky-high. The inner city of Honolulu would be well represented additionally in the back row by UH top three all-time digger, prodigious, Kanaka Maoli Hawai'ian libero. The Preseason/OOC gauntlet ran as follows: AVCA's #3 Minnesota (L, 0–3), #12 Kansas (W, 3–2), #22 San Diego (L, 0–3), #13 UCLA (L, 2–3), #22 Utah (L, 1–3), #10 BYU (L, 2–3). In conference UH subsequently encountered then ranked AVCA #23 Cal Poly SLO, twice (L, 2–3). 18 December 2017, Baylor University (24-7) ends at AVCA #21; the Wahine had beat them earlier, early (W, 3–2).

For this third season in a row, the last weekend of November, beginning with Thanksgiving Thursday, it gave the Wahine much in which to be thankful; R(est) & R(eflection) being key. Four matches scheduled, engaged in the season's last month of November (two at Home & on the road), it brought the uncertain.           
          
This team also featured two seniors, who had been recruited as 2013-14 classmates out of Huntington Beach (HBHS, Ca.). One was a not so initial AVCA, inaugural, HS 1st Team Beach all-American. The other, initially recruited, a surfer, deferred on Minnesota's interest to make her a part of the B1G Conference; tutelage was to have been experienced by way of USA Olympics MVB and WVB coach Hugh McCutcheon (2008 gold and 2012 silver awardee) respectively.

Prismatic 2019

The year started with matches featuring a colorful, rainbow-esk, display of adversarial schools' colors: Burnt Orange, Cardinal, Navy, Purple, Bruin Blue, Maroon, Green, the ubiquitous Gold. UHM's primary school colors are the Green and White. Baylor University, themselves ranked as high as #2 this season in the AVCA Coaches Poll, they, possessing an also-Green-cast, had beat the 'Bows within the first month's competition this season. The 2019 WVB NCAAT, of December, for post regular-season play, is/was within fortunate grasps. After a mini gaffe in 2018, due to the inclement weather of Hurricane Lane, the Wahine would again return to a minimal 20+ wins season.

The Wahine would again be a historic part of Stan Sheriff Center celebrations the third weekend of October. The silver anniversary year of SSC VB was played out in a match involving UC Davis. Going into the celebratory weekend both Na Wahine and the Aggies were tied for third (at 4–2) in the Big West Conference standings.

Formidable opponent UNL (Friday, December 13), second of the B1G, in 2019, they confirmed their ever large WVB following. The Wahine none-the-less, they remain themselves approved being proximate, also, west of the Mississippi River.

COVID-19 epoch (2020+ )
Quarantine protocols & "social distancing"

2020: season cancelled.
2021: Second Rnd NCAAT Exit, at defeat from #15 Washington.
2022: WVB began on March fourth versus AVCA '21 top 25 Pepperdine, in the regular season being @TAMU which included Pitt and San Diego too. 

In addition, be that as it may, the program has made 39 NCAA postseason appearances out of 40 years; they in fact did end up missing the 1992 NCAA tournament. The program has produced Olympians, All-Americans and five individuals named National Player of the Year since 1983. Richard Okamoto of MHS has been deceased since 1995. Jet setter Dave Shoji travels the world, even more so in this inaugural year. Lang Ping continues presently with volleyball in her native China as their national head coach. Rainbow Warrior Football nevertheless, earnestly, beneficially, looks to haul in Black (non-Red) operationally.

Milestone Birthdays
No.30: The 2001 ninth seeded 'Bows went 29–6, ending in The Long Beach, CA Regional, with a semifinal loss to UCLA (1–3). No.40: The Wahine would complete their season as the tenth seeded NCAA WVB team, in their own 2011 Honolulu Regional. Their record this season was 31–2; consequently, in their culminating loss Southern California beat them 2–3. No.50: The program is set to celebrate its Golden, having been birthed in 1972, in 2021. The University in 2022-23 decided to celebrate both the Wahine (female) as an Athletics Department whole, as well as Title IX 50th anniversary NCAA collegiate legislation.

Notable players
Linda Fernandez: Coach Kang trainee (1972-4); superstar of the professional International Volleyball Association. Gifted athlete 'til the 1980s featured on ABC-TV's Superstars (U.S. Men, Women, Networks, Olympic). Title IX beneficiary, being teammate AA Joyce Kapuaala-Kaapuni (herself a teammate to 3x AVCA All-American D. Collins). 
Lisa Strand-Ma'a (1981–84): Color commentator on Oc 16 TV for all things, UHM, volleyball (teammate to 2x National P.O.Y. Deitre Collins (1988 Seoul S. Korea Olympian)). Mother of Micah Maʻa.
Debbi Black: Gifted teaching Brethren, solid Beach volleyball professional. Miracle, subjectified, materfamilias; all-U.S.A. dimensioned. National Champion (NCAA), 1983, and 1986 Regional Finalists w AVCA No.1 University of the Pacific (United States), as AVCA No.2.
Suzanne Eagye-Cox: teo-time AVCA 1st Team All-American (1986-7) & '87 Nat'l Honda Award winner. Husband Tim is a pro motion picture's artist in the realm of blockbusting faith-based films. She was the 1987 PCAA/BWC P.O.Y.
Tonya "Teee" Williams: three-time 1st Team All-American (1987, 1988, 1989), 2-time AVCA National Player of the Year (1987, 1989). A member of the 1992 and 1996 USA Olympic Teams. She continued to win mid-2000s National Championships, indoors and beach, in Germany her place of residency.  
Karrie Trieschman-Poppinga (1987-1990): two-time 1st Team AVCA All-American (1989, 1990). Along with fellow Kama'aina Gabrielle Reece (w/4-person WBVL), she was a Nike, Inc. spokes model starring on the 2-person WPVA Tour (1992-7). 
Cheri Boyer (PHS c/o '88, top 3 U.S. recruit): from a family of pro's, b-i-l Trevor; sister Ann; sister Amy; sister Meri-de, who represent the S.W. SoCal region of America. Cheri was USAV 18s MVP; 1990–1991, twice, and then 1st team AVCA all-American; 2010 USAV 40s MVP. Costumed dressed, revelry attired, the sisters play 6-women Beach tourneys from San Diego to Los Angeles.
Jenny Wilton: Mike Wilton's daughter (at UH 1991–1995). She represented the USAV org. on the '89-1990 U.S. Women's Junior National Team, was an all BWC Frosh in 1991 and was team captain of a 28-0 regular season '95-team—the impetus for Wahine Ball: The Story of Hawai'i's Most Beloved Team. Her 'ohana is responsible for, questionably, the UH's only winning, 2002 NCAA MVB National Championships. Injury plagued, Hawaii Media deemed Jenny: Most inspiring. 
Angelica Ljungqvist: 1996 AVCA/Volleyball Magazine P.O.Y., four-time AVCA All-American, star on the 4-person WBVL tour (1997-8). A Stockholm barrister w/in the Swedish Volleyball Federation, Ljungqvist was involved in every aspect of SWED's national team (playing, beach; coaching; Olympic color commentating). She is currently the Associate Head Coach for the Hawaii Rainbow Wahine volleyball team.     
Jameka Stevens: Olympian, who had done it and won it all before stepping foot on the UHM campus (1997). After playing VB through 2000, she has traveled for Maternal and Children's Health, now 23 countries TD; this she did via Berkeley's post-2001 certification, in pharmaceutical research & development.  
Heather Bown: two-time 1st Team All-American (1998, 1999). Led the country in blocks in 1999, with over two blocks. The two-time WAC Player of the Year (1998, 1999) was also a three-time Olympian at the (2000, 2004, 2008) Olympic Games as a member of the USA indoor women's team.
Kim Willoughby: AVCA National Player of the Year (2003), three-time AVCA 1t Team All-American (2001, 2002, 2003), three-time WAC Player of the Year. 2008 USA Olympic Indoor women's team member. She is the all-time career kill leader at Hawaii and the Western Athletic Conference with 2,598 career kills.
Victoria Prince-Federline: two-time AVCA 2nd Team All-American (2004, 2005). Middle-blocker among those only at least twice recognized on all WAC teams for WAC All-Decade Volleyball team (2000-2009). She married her baby-daddy (in 2013 at the Hard Rock Hotel and Casino in Las Vegas) becoming stepmother to Britney Spears' Sean Preston and Jayden James Federline.
Kanoe Kamana'o: AVCA F.O.Y.; four-time All-American (2003-6). Ranks in the top 10 all time of NCAA assists. Hawaiian ambassador fly girl, post David Ige and politics.  
Raeceen Woolford: 'Iolani School's c/o 2003; progressively to 2006 (in all 35 matches) she earned starting spots at libero & back-row specialists, while serving Most phenomenally. She was crowned Miss Hawai'i 2009; she made the final cut of seven in the 2010 Miss America pageant, there she won Miss Congeniality. She's s-i-l to Chanteal Satele the Western U.S. Mid-major VIP, who was a four-time all conference(s), NCAA tourney participant. Their family includes: Chargers LB, father, Alvis; Dolphins C, cousin, Samson; Jets LB, brother, Brashton; Cardinals G, cousin, Hercules; Free agent, brother, Liko; 2x NCAA VB Champion, mother, LeeAnn Pestana (UHM 1982–1983).
Jamie Houston: five-time-named All-American, mentored by hometown's Rose Magers (2006 AVCA/Volleyball Mag. 3rd Team, 2007 Volleyball Mag. 3rd Team, 2008 AVCA 2nd Team & Volleyball Mag. 1st Team). Currently, her team Criollas de Caguas of Puerto Rico SuperLiga can be viewed on PBS San Juan, via DirecTV or Dish Network. 
Kanani Herring: She became "Beauty (as a Hawaiian translation)" Danielson in name, in 2009. Three-time AVCA 1st Team All American (2009–11), 4x AA. Lowe's 2011 CLASS Award rep. (re: Alamodome, San Antonio, TX). 2012 USAV Open Nationals MVP. 
Emily Hartong: Multiple AVCA all-American (thrice as a Blocker/Wing-Spiker) from 2011 to 2013. She began as an inaugural athlete of NCAA BVB, which eventually parlayed into the AVP. She'd also champion a gold medal in Moscow, Russia the initial world's stop for Snow VB. Participants included UH BVB AAs Cook & Spieler. 
Jane Croson: 2010 FIVB (U-19) Beach World Champion with partner Summer Ross, 2010 NORCECA (U-20) Women's Continental Champion; tournament MVP, three-time all WACs & BWC selection (2011, 2012), 2012 AVCA Collegiate Beach VB All-American, 2015 South Pacific Games gold medalist (team American Samoa); v Tahiti. § (Women) Volleyball-movies p5433 #2148, Alyssa Longo: 2010 NCAA national champion. 2014 UHM indoor Student Assistant-coach. 2014 AVCA, preNCAA-emerging, Beach VB Final Four participant (at 20–4). 
Nikki Taylor: 4x All-American (2014-2015 Beach; AVCA). Father Graham, 50th State, renown, PSY.D, transferred by extension, or metaphor, that which shouldn't be confused with Floridian Niki Taylor. The latter being also plagued with injury though confidently faithful in boldness of Glory—application(s)—eternally, a single 'k' differentially.
Emily Maglio: w DVM, a.k.a. "Mags." Vancouver Canucks Pre pre-Farm Team (Nursery club: grades second thru ninth). Three time AVCA all-American (2016–18).
Norene Iosia: (Los Angeles) Starlings Volleyball, USA start. Gold medalist with Team American Samoa at 2015 SPG. Four-time 1st team all Big West, the only TD in Wahine VB History; selected 2019 POY. USAV WJNT. AVCA HM all-American. Wahine Beach VB starter on perennial NCAA top 10 team (2020). Family: Father Moe, from Team Samoa VB; Mother Marlene, from Haili VB; Sister Nalani, from Texas Longhorns women's volleyball.

Of note professionally
Mauian-Cecelia Goods, Europe (c/o 1997–1998); Amber Kaufman, Europe (2010 w/ USTFCCCA also); Aneli Cubi-Otineru, Caribbean (2010 O+ Bonham); Muhammad Ali Scholar for Peace & Justice-Amanda Simmons, West Africa (Philanthropic work, too, in Central America & Western Europe); Tara Hittle, Europe (2010-2011); Dani Mafua, Europe (c/o 2010–2011); Jane Croson, AVP (Team 2011–2012); Kanani (a.k.a. Beaut Herring) Danielson, Asia, Alex Griffiths, USAV (c/o 2011–2012); Falyn Fonoimoana, Caribbean (student, 2011–2012); Katie Spieler, AVP (Team 2012); Mrs. Juliana Sanders-Brian Beckwith, Europe (in 2013); Emily Hartong, Europe, Mita Uiato, Europe, Ashley Kastl, USAV, Ali Longo, Europe (c/o 2013–2014); Blessed-G. Long (to be, 2014–2015) w quasi Czech's S.K. Bron, Europe; Tai Manu Olevao, Asia, Olivia Magill, Europe (c/o 2015–2016); H. Illustre–Pascua, AVP Wa. (Seattle, in at #29); Nikki Taylor, Europe, Annie Mitchem, Europe (c/o 2016–2017); Kalei Adolpho, KoHA WBB (2015–present,'18); Clare-Marie Anderson, Europe (Nobel Peace Prize Institute, Norway), Emily Maglio, Europe (c/o 2017–2018); Kendra Koelsch, AVP Manhattan Beach Open (Gold Series, in at #41); Reyn "Tita" Akiu, thru American Sports Centers, Casey Castillo, Europe, Angel Gaskin, Europe (c/o 2018–2019); Norene Iosia, Pan-Eurasia (c/o 2019–2020); Harlee Kekauoha, Europe (BVB c/o 2020–2021); Brooke Van Sickle, AVP by U.S. BCNT (c/o 2021–2022); Lily Kahumoku, Europe & Caribbean (2003-2009, 2023)

During the 2002 and 2013 regular seasons, the Rainbows played first ever exhibition matches against Samorodok (Russia) and the Toyota Queenseis, a Japanese professional team (commonly). An AVCA All American Duggins-sister#1, she was business scouted (by happenstance), then recruited consequently, as fated, historically, for the former Union of Soviet Socialist Republics (post 2002–2003).

Those of THE experience (out in Dec. 2000), post NCAA Final Four– AVEN LEE is currently the UHM Director of Volleyball Operations; NorCal Canada College Professor JESSICA SUDDUTH-Kaven chairs Communication Studies; singer ANDREA GOMEZ-TUKUAFU in musical recording art performs professionally; too, VERONICA LIMA'' reports on Brasilia radio, akin to the Federal Communications Commission agency. Lily Kahumoku (2000): earns WAC P.O.Y., AVCA All-West Region team, first team AVCA All-American and is named to the NCAA Championship all-tournament team. Kim Willoughby (2000): debuts, with a near triple-double, on 9/1, against TAMU in the season opener (14 kills, 15 digs and six blocks). Closing in the 1-3 NU loss, Kim clocks-in with 15 (kills and digs both).

Program record and history

Team facts

Head coach
 1972–1974: Alan Kang
 1975–2017:  Dave Shoji
 2017–present: Robyn Ah Mow
Robyn Ah Mow, a former player and assistant coach for the Rainbow Wahine, was named head coach in February 2017 immediately upon the announcement of Dave Shoji's retirement. Dave Shoji was the head coach of the Rainbow Wahine Volleyball team from 1975 to 2017. As of 2013, he was the winningest Division I women's volleyball head coach. He is a member of the NCAA Volleyball Division 1 25th Anniversary Team.  In addition, he has been named the National Coach of the Year by the American Volleyball Coach's Association twice—in 1982 and 2009.  He was named Region Coach of the Year nine times and the conference Coach of the Year eleven times.  In 2010, he was inducted into the AVCA's Hall of Fame. He co-authored with Ann Miller, Wahine Volleyball: 40 Years of Coaching Hawaii's Team (2013).

League
 1974–80: Association for Intercollegiate Athletics for Women (AIAW)
 1981–present: NCAA Division I

Conference
 1985–1995, 2012–present: Pacific Coast Athletic Association (PCAA) / Big West Conference
 1996–2011: Western Athletic Conference (WAC)

Home court
 1975–1994: Klum Gym/Neal Blaisdell Center
 1988, 2012: War Memorial Stadium Complex (Wailuku, Maui)
 1994–present: Stan Sheriff Center (SSC)

National championships
 1979: AIAW by defeating Utah State, 8–15, 7–15, 15–9, 16–14, 15–12
 1982: NCAA by defeating USC, 14–16, 9–15, 15–13, 15–10, 15–12
 1983: NCAA by defeating UCLA, 15–13, 15–4, 15–10 
 1987: NCAA by defeating Stanford, 15–10, 15–10, 9–15, 15–1

In film
The formation of the first Rainbow Wahine volleyball team is chronicled in the documentary film Rise of the Wahine, directed by Dean Kaneshiro. Rise features the struggles of these first teams after the passing of Title IX and highlights the roles of coaches Alan Kang and Dave Shoji, first female Athletic Director Dr. Donnis Thompson, Patsy Mink, and players from the first teams, including Diana McInerny, Marilyn Moniz-Kaho`ohanonaho, Joyce Ka'apuni, and Joey Akeo.

In print
Wahine Ball: The Story of Hawai'i's Most Beloved Team, by Dean Chadwin, details the evolution of a once-genteel game born one hundred years ago in a Massachusetts "Y" and the University of HI. By telling the story of one of the most popular collegiate teams in volleyball history, Chadwin comparatively links the timeworn establishments in his publishing dated April, 1997.

NCAA representation
On November 1, 2005, for immediate release, the NCAA Press issued for the public and media relations an NCAA Division I Women's Volleyball 25th Anniversary Team. The team featured 1983 Honda-Broderick Cup winner Middle Blocker Deitre Collins, who's a 2017 Inaugural SCIVBHOF Inductee, including: Andy Banachowski, Laurel Brassey, Craig Buck, Tara Cross, Bob Ctvrtlik, Dusty Dvorak, Rolf Engen, Debbie Green, Kathy Gregory, Bryan Ivie, Karch Kiraly, Ricci Luyties, Chris Marlowe, Misty May, Kim Oden, Mike O’Hara, Doug Partie, Al Scates, Gene Selznick, Sinjin Smith, Jeff Stork, Steve Timmons, Paula Weishoff; Coach Dave Shoji being awarded as head coach, likewise, of seven total NCAA honorees. Tonya "Teee" Williams had too been further named to the 1980s NCAA all-Decade team for accolades. Also, the NCAA no longer awards athletes with All-American recognition as they once did in the one and only year, for 1981 (Wahine Diane Sabastian-Pestolesi).

See also
List of NCAA Division I women's volleyball programs

References

Other sources
University of Hawaii, Women's Volleyball page
US Olympic Committee Includes lists of past Olympians
American Volleyball Coaches Association Division I awards – Lists of volleyball award winners
NCAA Division I Volleyball information page. The current NCAA Volleyball Records Book may be obtained (in PDF format) from this page.
Big West Women's Volleyball page
The Big West Conference Volleyball Records Book (PDF)
The Western Athletic Conference Women's Volleyball page
The Western Athletic Conference Volleyball Records book (PDF)
  NCAA Volleyball Record Book (2005), p. 106–107
  NCAA Division I Volleyball 25th Anniversary Team
  "Assistant coach helped unite Wahine", Honolulu Star Bulletin, November 10, 1999
  The Big West Conference Volleyball Records Book, p. 43
  Hawaii Pacific University Athletics Department, Tita Ahuna
  Hawaii Pacific University Athletics Department, Volleyball history
   Cornell University Athletics Department, Deidre Collins
 (Honda-)Broderick Award winners
  NCAA Division I Volleyball 25th Anniversary Team
  University of Hawaii Athletics Department, Marilyn Moniz-Kahoohanohano
  Rise of the Wahine Documentary Film.
https://en.wikipedia.org/wiki/Wikipedia:Manual_of_Style/Words_to_watch#/media/File:Peacock_terms.png

External links